Shafik Fauzan bin Sharif is a Malaysian politician and served as Pahang State Executive Councillor.

Election Results

Honours
 :
 Knight Companion of the Order of the Crown of Pahang (DIMP) – Dato' (2008)
 Knight Companion of the Order of Sultan Ahmad Shah of Pahang (DSAP) – Dato' (2012)
 Grand Knight of the Order of Sultan Ahmad Shah of Pahang (SSAP) – Dato' Sri (2017)

References

United Malays National Organisation politicians
Members of the Pahang State Legislative Assembly
Pahang state executive councillors
21st-century Malaysian politicians
Living people
Year of birth missing (living people)
People from Pahang
Malaysian people of Malay descent
Malaysian Muslims